Hybrid Tango II is Argentine electrotango band Tanghetto's sixth studio album. The album was released in May 2014.

Hybrid Tango II is the first studio album by Tanghetto featuring vocals ("No me rindo" and "Aires de Buenos Aires" are performed by Tabaré Leyton while Max Masri himself sings a cover version of "Vuelvo al Sur").

Hybrid Tango II is "an experiment in which Tanghetto tried to recreate -in the present day context- the influences brought by immigrants more than a hundred years ago, bringing an embryo of tango to life. In the musical 'conventillo' of today, the sounds are very different, and thus also the result."

In 2014, the album was nominated for a Latin Grammy Award.

Track list 
 "Bohemian Tango" (3:23)
 "Viveza Criolla" (4:39)
 "El Miedo a la Libertad" (4:08)
 "No me rindo" (3:49)
 "Quejas de Bandoneón" (tango by Juan de Dios Filiberto) (2:48)
 "Milonga del Chamuyo" (3:16)
 "Quién me quita lo bailado" (3:35)
 "Aires de Buenos Aires" (3:36)
 "A Flor de Piel" (4:50)
 "Milonguita Burlona" (3:14)
 "Vuelvo al Sur" (Astor Piazzolla / Pino Solanas) (4:26)
 "La Traición" (4:32)

Personnel

Videoclips 
Quién me quita lo bailado (2014)

References

2014 albums
Tanghetto albums